Mũkoma wa Ngũgĩ (born 1971) is a Kenyan American poet, author, and academic. He is associate professor of literatures in English at Cornell University and co-founder of the Safal-Cornell Kiswahili Prize for African Writing. His father is the author Ngũgĩ wa Thiong'o. His family was deeply impacted by the bloody British suppression of the Mau Mau revolution.

Biography
Mũkoma was born in 1971 in Evanston, Illinois, US, but raised in Kenya, before returning to the United States for his university education. He holds a BA in political science from Albright College and an MA in creative writing from Boston University. He received his Ph.D. from the University of Wisconsin at Madison, where he specialized in how questions of authorized and unauthorized English, or standard and non-standard English, influenced literary aesthetics in Romantic Britain and Independence-Era Africa. He is an associate professor of English at Cornell University.

He is the author of several books, including Conversing with Africa: Politics of Change (2003, described by New Internationalist as "a wide-ranging investigation of Africa's dilemmas"), Hurling Words at Consciousness (poetry, Africa World Press, 2006) and Nairobi Heat (novel, 2009). His most recent book is The Rise of the African Novel: Politics of Language, Identity, and Ownership (2018). He is also a columnist for BBC Focus on Africa magazine and former co-editor of Pambazuka News.

He has published poems in Tin House Magazine, Chimurenga, Brick magazine, Smartish Pace, and Teeth in the Wind, One Hundred Days (Barque Press); New Black Writing (John Wiley and Sons); Réflexions sur le Génocide rwandais/Ten Years Later: Reflections on the Rwandan Genocide (L'Harmattan).

In addition, he has published political essays and columns in the LA Times, Radical History Review, World Literature Today, Mail and Guardian, Zimbabwe’s Herald, Kenya’s Daily Nation, The EastAfrican, Kwani? journal, and zmag.org among other publications. His short story "How Kamau Wa Mwangi Escaped into Exile" was shortlisted for the Caine Prize in 2009 and is included in the anthology Work in Progress - And Other Stories (Caine Prize: Annual Prize for African Writing) (New Internationalist, 2009). His work was also shortlisted for the 2010 Penguin Prize for African Writing.

Some of Mũkoma's poems have been archived on Badilisha Poetry X-Change.

Mũkoma stated that with Queen Elizabeth II’s death, there needs to be a “dismantling” of the Commonwealth and a real reckoning with colonial abuses.

Books
Conversing with Africa: Politics of Change (2003), 
Hurling Words at Consciousness (Africa World Press, 2006), 
Nairobi Heat – novel (Melville House Publishing, 2009), 
Black Star Nairobi – novel (Melville House Publishing, 2013), 
Killing Sahara – novel (Kwela Books, 2013), 
Mrs. Shaw: A Novel (Ohio University Press, 2015), 
Logotherapy – poetry (University of Nebraska Press, 2016), 
The Rise of the African Novel: Politics of Language, Identity, and Ownership (University of Michigan Press, 2018),

References

External links
Author's website.
Column archive at The Guardian
Profile at Mad Poetry
Profile at Writers.net
Toward an Africa without Borders Organization

Lunga Mkila, "The Enigma of Ethnic Violence: Mukoma wa Ngugi’s Novel Killing Sahara", The Con, 17 October 2013.
 Webcast at the Library of Congress, 12 March 2013

1971 births
Living people
Kenyan poets
Boston University College of Arts and Sciences alumni
Cornell University faculty
Kenyan novelists
Kenyan essayists
Albright College alumni
University of Wisconsin–Madison alumni
21st-century short story writers